Md. Ashraful Islam  is a major general in the Bangladesh Army and incumbent chairman of Bangladesh Tea Board. Earlier, he was Senior Directing Staff (Army-3) at National Defence College.

Career 
After completed SSC & HSC from Rangpur Cadet College Ashraful Islam joined Bangladesh Army. He has served in UN Mission as contingent 2IC in Demining Coy in Ethopia/ Eritrea UNMEE and as Force Engineer at Force HQ in UNMIS and UNMISS. He also served as Chief Engineer at Sena Kalyan Sangstha and as Engineer Adviser at Ministry of Defence. He also served as Director of Works, E in C’s Branch at Army Headquarters.

References 

Bangladesh Army generals
Bangladeshi military personnel
Bangladeshi generals
Living people
1968 births